The Unión Centroamericana de Fútbol (Central American Football Union), more commonly known by the acronym UNCAF, represents the national football teams of Central America: Belize, Costa Rica, El Salvador, Guatemala, Honduras, Nicaragua, and Panama. Its member associations are part of CONCACAF.

Member associations

Competitions

Overview
The UNCAF organize various competitions. The Copa Centroamericana was played every two years from 1991 until 2017, and usually featured the seven national teams. Costa Rica is the most successful team, winning the tournament eight times. Honduras won the tournament four times while Guatemala and Panama won once each. This tournament usually ran as a qualification round for the CONCACAF Gold Cup.

The UNCAF also ran the Copa Interclubes UNCAF, a competition for the champions and runners-up of the domestic leagues of the UNCAF members; C.D. Motagua (Honduras) was the last champion (2007). Similarly to the Copa Centroamericana, this competition qualified three teams to the CONCACAF Champions' Cup. As it expanded into the CONCACAF Champions League in 2008, all of the Central American nations have at least one team and the Copa Interclubes UNCAF was disbanded.

National teams
Copa Centroamericana – Was the International tournament for Central America, top 4–5 qualify for the CONCACAF Gold Cup.

Club teams
Copa Interclubes UNCAF – Was a club championship for Central America in which the top 3 teams qualified for CONCACAF Champions' Cup.
UNCAF Women's Interclub Championship – First edition held in 2016.
UNCAF runs several competitions which cover men's, women's, youth and futsal.

Current title holders

Major tournament records

National teams appearances in international tournaments

See also 
 CONCACAF League
 CONCACAF
 Caribbean Football Union (CFU)
 North American Football Union (NAFU)
 North American Football Confederation (NAFC)
 Confederación Centroamericana y del Caribe de Fútbol (CCCF)

References

External links 
 UNCAF official website  

 
 
 
Association football sub-confederations
Sports organizations established in 1990
1990 establishments in North America